Wayne Oliver Burkes (December 6, 1929 – May 5, 2020) was an American politician, Baptist minister, and military officer.

Early life and education 
Burkes was born in Neshoba County, Mississippi near Philadelphia, Mississippi. He graduated from Mississippi College and studied at the New Orleans Baptist Theological Seminary. 

He was ordained a Baptist minister and served in several churches. Burkes served in the Mississippi Air National Guard and retired as a lieutenant general.

Career 
Burkes served as a Democrat in the Mississippi House of Representatives from 1976 to 1980 and in the Mississippi Senate from 1980 to 1989. In 1989, he was elected Highway (later renamed Transportation) Commissioner of the Central District of Mississippi. 

In 1995, he switched to the Republican Party to run for reelection, becoming the first ever serious GOP candidate for Highway/Transportation Commissioner in the state and only the second ever and was reelected overwhelmingly.  

He was nominated by President Bill Clinton for a seat on the Surface Transportation Board (STB), and served from 1999 to 2002. He resigned on March 20, 2003 as vice chair of the STB. Burkes ran for Mississippi State Treasurer in 2003, but lost to future Governor Tate Reeves in the Republican primary.

Later life 
Burkes died at the Mississippi Veterans House in Kosciusko, Mississippi.

References

1929 births
2020 deaths
People from Neshoba County, Mississippi
Mississippi College alumni
New Orleans Baptist Theological Seminary alumni
Mississippi National Guard personnel
Baptists from Mississippi
Members of the Mississippi House of Representatives
Mississippi state senators
Mississippi Democrats
Mississippi Republicans

Surface Transportation Board personnel